Funsho is a name of Yoruba descent common in Nigeria. It means "God has given me to watch over".

Notable people with the name 

 Funsho Adeolu, Nigerian actor 
 Funso Aiyejina, Nigerian poet 
 Funsho Bamgboye, Nigerian footballer 
 Funsho Ogundipe, Nigerian pianist 
 Funso Ojo, Belgian footballer
 Funsho Williams, Nigerian politician

References 

Yoruba given names